Ole Mathias Sejersted (born 7 June 1947) is a Norwegian medical doctor, professor emeritus at the University of Oslo.
 
Sejersted graduated as cand.med. in 1973. He graduated as dr. med. from the University of Oslo in 1978. His research areas have included renal function, muscle fatigue and heart failure. As of 2017 and 2018 he is praeses of the Norwegian Academy of Science and Letters; he was elected member of the academy in 1998. He has also been vice dean of the Faculty of Medicine, University of Oslo.  

He was decorated Commander of the Order of St. Olav in 2018.

References

1947 births
Living people
Oslo University Hospital people
University of Oslo alumni
Members of the Norwegian Academy of Science and Letters